In the mathematical fields of differential geometry and geometric measure theory, homological integration or geometric integration is a method for extending the notion of the integral to manifolds.  Rather than functions or differential forms, the integral is defined over currents on a manifold.

The theory is "homological" because currents themselves are defined by duality with differential forms. Thus there is a pairing between -currents  and -forms , denoted here by

Under this duality pairing, the exterior derivative 

goes over to a boundary operator

defined by

for all .  This is a homological rather than cohomological construction.

References
.
.

Definitions of mathematical integration
Measure theory